Welder Camargo Knaf (born 6 April 1981) is a Brazilian para table tennis player who competes in international level events. He is a triple Parapan American Games champion, triple Pan American champion and a Paralympic silver medalist at the 2008 Summer Paralympics with Luiz Algacir Silva.

References

1981 births
Living people
People from Guarapuava
Paralympic table tennis players of Brazil
Table tennis players at the 2008 Summer Paralympics
Table tennis players at the 2012 Summer Paralympics
Table tennis players at the 2016 Summer Paralympics
Medalists at the 2008 Summer Paralympics
Medalists at the 2007 Parapan American Games
Medalists at the 2011 Parapan American Games
Medalists at the 2015 Parapan American Games
Medalists at the 2019 Parapan American Games
Table tennis players at the 2020 Summer Paralympics
Sportspeople from Paraná (state)
Brazilian male table tennis players
20th-century Brazilian people
21st-century Brazilian people